Antonio Araujo Silva (born August 26, 1985 in Jordão), known by his nickname Araujo Jordão, is a Brazilian footballer who plays for Rio Branco–AC as forward. He already played for national competitions such as Copa do Brasil, Campeonato Brasileiro Série C and Campeonato Brasileiro Série D.

Career statistics

References

External links

1985 births
Living people
Brazilian footballers
Association football forwards
Campeonato Brasileiro Série C players
Campeonato Brasileiro Série D players
Rio Branco Football Club players
Clube Recreativo e Atlético Catalano players